The MacFam Cavalier is a homebuilt aircraft designed by Stan McLeod, developed through a progressing series of models, all using all-wooden construction.  The model range includes the SA102, SA102.5, SA103, SA104 and the SA105.

Design and development
The Cavalier was a new design based on the French wooden homebuilt GY-20 Minicab designed by Yves Gardan in 1949. The plans were translated from French to English and modified by Stan Mcleod. The plans were marketed by K&S Aircraft of Calgary, Alberta and later MacFam.

The Cavalier is a two-seat side-by-side configuration homebuilt that uses all-wood construction. The landing gear may be configured as fixed, or retractable, in tricycle or conventional layout. The wing uses a single box spar covered in 3/32" plywood leading edge skins. The entire wing is fabric covered.

Later series can use larger engines. SA102 options included wing tip tanks and a third jump seat.

Variants
SA102
1963 Interchangeable tricycle gear to conventional gear configuration with sliding canopy.
SA102.5
1968 model
SA103
Conventional gear version of Super Cavalier
SA104
Tricycle gear version of Super Cavalier
SA105 Super Cavalier
1968 model retractable tricycle gear model. Engineered for larger 200hp engines.

Aircraft on display

Winnipeg James Armstrong Richardson International Airport - main terminal building.

Specifications (SA105 Super Cavalier)

See also

References

Cavalier
1960s Canadian sport aircraft
Single-engined tractor aircraft
Low-wing aircraft
Homebuilt aircraft
Aircraft first flown in 1963